Pencak silat at the 2008 Asian Beach Games was held from 18 October to 22 October in Bali, Indonesia.

Medalists

Men

Women

Medal table

Results

Men

Tunggal

19 October

Ganda

22 October

Tanding 50 kg

Tanding 85 kg

Women

Tunggal

22 October

Ganda

19 October

Tanding 50 kg

Tanding 65 kg

References
 Official site

2008 Asian Beach Games events